PowerVR is a division of Imagination Technologies (formerly VideoLogic) that develops hardware and software for 2D and 3D rendering, and for video encoding, decoding, associated image processing and DirectX, OpenGL ES, OpenVG, and OpenCL acceleration. PowerVR also develops AI accelerators called Neural Network Accelerator (NNA).

The PowerVR product line was originally introduced to compete in the desktop PC market for 3D hardware accelerators with a product with a better price–performance ratio than existing products like those from 3dfx Interactive. Rapid changes in that market, notably with the introduction of OpenGL and Direct3D, led to rapid consolidation. PowerVR introduced new versions with low-power electronics that were aimed at the laptop computer market. Over time, this developed into a series of designs that could be incorporated into system-on-a-chip architectures suitable for handheld device use.

PowerVR accelerators are not manufactured by PowerVR, but instead their integrated circuit designs and patents are licensed to other companies, such as Texas Instruments, Intel, NEC, BlackBerry, Renesas, Samsung, Sony, STMicroelectronics, Freescale, Apple, NXP Semiconductors (formerly Philips Semiconductors), and many others.

Technology 
The PowerVR chipset uses a method of 3D rendering known as tile-based deferred rendering (often abbreviated as TBDR) which is tile-based rendering combined with PowerVR's proprietary method of Hidden Surface Removal (HSR) and Hierarchical Scheduling Technology (HST). As the polygon generating program feeds triangles to the PowerVR (driver), it stores them in memory in a triangle strip or an indexed format. Unlike other architectures, polygon rendering is (usually) not performed until all polygon information has been collated for the current frame. Furthermore, the expensive operations of texturing and shading of pixels (or fragments) is delayed, whenever possible, until the visible surface at a pixel is determined — hence rendering is deferred.

In order to render, the display is split into rectangular sections in a grid pattern. Each section is known as a tile. Associated with each tile is a list of the triangles that visibly overlap that tile. Each tile is rendered in turn to produce the final image.

Tiles are rendered using a process similar to ray-casting. Rays are numerically simulated as if cast onto the triangles associated with the tile and a pixel is rendered from the triangle closest to the camera. The PowerVR hardware typically calculates the depths associated with each polygon for one tile row in 1 cycle.

This method has the advantage that, unlike a more traditional early Z rejection based hierarchical systems, no calculations need to be made to determine what a polygon looks like in an area where it is obscured by other geometry. It also allows for correct rendering of partially transparent polygons, independent of the order in which they are processed by the polygon producing application. (This capability was only implemented in Series 2 including Dreamcast and one MBX variant. It is generally not included for lack of API support and cost reasons.)
More importantly, as the rendering is limited to one tile at a time, the whole tile can be in fast on-chip memory, which is flushed to video memory before processing the next tile. Under normal circumstances, each tile is visited just once per frame.

PowerVR is a pioneer of tile based deferred rendering. Microsoft also conceptualized the idea with their abandoned Talisman project. Gigapixel, a company that developed IP for tile-based 3D graphics, was purchased by 3dfx, which in turn was subsequently purchased by Nvidia. Nvidia has now been shown to use tile rendering in the Maxwell and Pascal microarchitectures for a limited amount of geometry.

ARM began developing another major tile based architecture known as Mali after their acquisition of Falanx.

Intel uses a similar concept in their integrated graphics products. However, its method, called zone rendering, does not perform full hidden surface removal (HSR) and deferred texturing, therefore wasting fillrate and texture bandwidth on pixels that are not visible in the final image.

Recent advances in hierarchical Z-buffering have effectively incorporated ideas previously only used in deferred rendering, including the idea of being able to split a scene into tiles and of potentially being able to accept or reject tile sized pieces of polygon.

Today, the PowerVR software and hardware suite has ASICs for video encoding, decoding and associated image processing. It also has virtualisation, and DirectX, OpenGL ES, OpenVG, and OpenCL acceleration.
Newest PowerVR Wizard GPUs have fixed-function Ray Tracing Unit (RTU) hardware and support hybrid rendering.

PowerVR Graphics

Series1 (NEC)

The first series of PowerVR cards was mostly designed as 3D-only accelerator boards that would use the main 2D video card's memory as framebuffer over PCI. Videologic's first PowerVR PC product to market was the 3-chip Midas3, which saw very limited availability in some OEM Compaq PCs. This card had very poor compatibility with all but the first Direct3D games, and even most SGL games did not run. However, its internal 24-bit color precision rendering was notable for the time.

The single-chip PCX1 was released in retail as the VideoLogic Apocalypse 3D and featured an improved architecture with more texture memory, ensuring better game compatibility. This was followed by the further refined PCX2, which clocked 6 MHz higher, offloaded some driver work by including more chip functionality and added bilinear filtering, and was released in retail on the Matrox M3D and Videologic Apocalypse 3Dx cards. There was also the Videologic Apocalypse 5D Sonic, which combined the PCX2 accelerator with a Tseng ET6100 2D core and ESS Agogo sound on a single PCI board.

The PowerVR PCX cards were placed in the market as budget products and performed well in the games of their time, but weren't quite as fully featured as the 3DFX Voodoo accelerators (due to certain blending modes being unavailable, for instance). However, the PowerVR approach of rendering to the 2D card's memory meant that much higher 3D rendering resolutions could be possible in theory, especially with PowerSGL games that took full advantage of the hardware.

 All models support DirectX 3.0 and PowerSGL, MiniGL drivers available for select games

 1 Texture mapping units: render output units
2 Midas3 is 3-chip (vs. single-chip PCX series) and uses a split memory architecture: 1 MB 32-bit SDRAM (240 MB/s peak bandwidth) for textures and 1 MB 16-bit FPM DRAM for geometry data (and presumably for PCI communication). PCX series has only texture memory.

Series2 (NEC)
The second generation PowerVR2 ("PowerVR Series2", chip codename "CLX2") was brought to market in the Dreamcast console between 1998 and 2001. As part of an internal competition at Sega to design the successor to the Saturn, the PowerVR2 was licensed to NEC and was chosen ahead of a rival design based on the 3dfx Voodoo2. It was called "the Highlander Project" during development. The PowerVR2 was paired with the Hitachi SH-4 in the Dreamcast, with the SH-4 as the T&L geometry engine and the PowerVR2 as the rendering engine. The PowerVR2 also powered the Sega Naomi, the upgraded arcade system board counterpart of the Dreamcast.

However, the success of the Dreamcast meant that the PC variant, sold as Neon 250, appeared a year late to the market, in late 1999. The Neon 250 was nevertheless competitive with the RIVA TNT2 and Voodoo3. The Neon 250 features inferior hardware specifications compared to the PowerVR2 part used in Dreamcast, such as a halved tile size, among others.

 All models are fabricated with a 250 nm process
 All models support DirectX 6.0 
 PMX1 supports PowerSGL 2 and includes a MiniGL driver optimized for Quake III Arena

 1 Texture mapping units: render output units
2 Fillrate for opaque polygons.
3 Fillrate for translucent polygons with hardware sort depth of 60.
4 Hitachi SH-4 geometry engine calculates T&L for more than 10 million triangles per second. CLX2 rendering engine throughput is 7 million triangles per second.

Series3 (STMicro)

In 2000, the third generation PowerVR3 STG4000 KYRO was released, manufactured by new partner STMicroelectronics. The architecture was redesigned for better game compatibility and expanded to a dual-pipeline design for more performance. The refresh STM PowerVR3 KYRO II, released later in 2001, likely had a lengthened pipeline to attain higher clock speeds and was able to rival the more expensive ATI Radeon DDR and NVIDIA GeForce 2 GTS in some benchmarks of the time, despite its modest specifications on paper and lack of hardware transform and lighting (T&L), a fact that Nvidia especially tried to capitalize on in a confidential paper they sent out to reviewers. As games increasingly started to include more geometry with this feature in mind, the KYRO II lost its competitiveness.

The KYRO series had a decent featureset for a budget-oriented GPU in their time, including a few Direct3D 8.1-compliant features such as 8-layer multitexturing (not 8-pass) and Environment Mapped Bump Mapping (EMBM); Full Scene Anti-Aliasing (FSAA) and Trilinear/Anisotropic filtering were also present. KYRO II could also perform Dot Product (Dot3) Bump Mapping at a similar speed as GeForce 2 GTS in benchmarks. Omissions included hardware T&L (an optional feature in Direct3D 7), Cube Environment Mapping and legacy 8-bit paletted texture support. While the chip supported S3TC/DXTC texture compression, only the (most commonly used) DXT1 format was supported. Support for the proprietary PowerSGL API was also dropped with this series.

16-bit output quality was excellent compared to most of its competitors, thanks to rendering to its internal 32-bit tile cache and downsampling to 16-bit instead of straight use of a 16-bit framebuffer. This could play a role in improving performance without losing much image quality, as memory bandwidth was not plentiful. However, due to its unique concept on the market, the architecture could sometimes exhibit flaws such as missing geometry in games, and therefore the driver had a notable amount of compatibility settings, such as switching off the internal Z-buffer. These settings could cause a negative impact on performance.

A second refresh of the KYRO was planned for 2002, the STG4800 KYRO II SE. Samples of this card were sent to reviewers but it does not appear to have been brought to market. Apart from a clockspeed boost, this refresh was announced with a "EnT&L" HW T&L software emulation, which eventually made it into the drivers for the previous KYRO cards starting with version 2.0. The STG5500 KYRO III, based upon the next-generation PowerVR4, was completed and would have included hardware T&L but was shelved due to STMicro closing its graphics division.

 All models support DirectX 6.0

 1 Texture mapping units: render output units

Series4 (STMicro)
PowerVR achieved great success in the mobile graphics market with its low power PowerVR MBX. MBX, and its SGX successors, are licensed by seven of the top ten semiconductor manufacturers including Intel, Texas Instruments, Samsung, NEC, NXP Semiconductors, Freescale, Renesas and Sunplus. The chips were used in many high-end cellphones including the original iPhone and iPod Touch, Nokia N95, Sony Ericsson P1 and Motorola RIZR Z8. It was also used in some PDA's such as the Dell Axim X50V and X51V featuring the MBX Lite powered Intel 2700G, as well as in set-top boxes featuring the MBX Lite-powered Intel CE 2110.

There are two variants: MBX and MBX Lite. Both have the same feature set. MBX is optimized for speed and MBX Lite is optimized for low power consumption. MBX could be paired up with an FPU, Lite FPU, VGP Lite and VGP.

Series5 (SGX)
PowerVR's Series5 SGX series features pixel, vertex, and geometry shader hardware, supporting OpenGL ES 2.0 and DirectX 10.1 with Shader Model 4.1.

The SGX GPU core is included in several popular systems-on-chip (SoC) used in many portable devices. Apple uses the A4 (manufactured by Samsung) in their iPhone 4, iPad, iPod Touch, and Apple TV, and uses the Apple S1 in the Apple Watch. Texas Instruments' OMAP 3 and 4 series SoC's are used in the Amazon's Kindle Fire HD 8.9", Barnes and Noble's Nook HD(+), BlackBerry PlayBook, Nokia N9, Nokia N900, Sony Ericsson Vivaz, Motorola Droid/Milestone, Motorola Defy, Motorola RAZR D1/D3, Droid Bionic, Archos 70, Palm Pre, Samsung Galaxy SL, Galaxy Nexus, Open Pandora, and others. Samsung produces the Hummingbird SoC and uses it in their Samsung Galaxy S, Galaxy Tab, Samsung Wave S8500 Samsung Wave II S8530 and Samsung Wave III S860 devices. Hummingbird is also in Meizu M9 smartphone.

Intel uses the SGX540 in its Medfield platform for smartphones.

Series5XT (SGX)

PowerVR Series5XT SGX chips are multi-core variants of the SGX series with some updates. It is included in the PlayStation Vita portable gaming device with the MP4+ Model of the PowerVR SGX543, the only intended difference, aside from the + indicating features customized for Sony, is the cores, where MP4 denotes 4 cores (quad-core) whereas the MP8 denotes 8 cores (octo-core). The Allwinner A31 (quad-core mobile application processor) features the dual-core SGX544 MP2. The Apple iPad 2 and iPhone 4S with the A5 SoC also feature a dual-core SGX543MP2. The iPad (3rd generation) A5X SoC features the quad-core SGX543MP4. The iPhone 5 A6 SoC features the tri-core SGX543MP3. The iPad (4th generation) A6X SoC features the quad-core SGX554MP4. The Exynos variant of the Samsung Galaxy S4 sports the tri-core SGX544MP3 clocked at 533 MHz.

These GPU can be used in either single-core or multi-core configurations.

Series5XE (SGX) 
Introduced in 2014, the PowerVR GX5300 GPU is based on the SGX architecture and is the world's smallest Android-capable graphics core, providing low-power products for entry-level smartphones, wearables, IoT and other small footprint embedded applications, including enterprise devices such as printers.

Series6 (Rogue)
PowerVR Series6 GPUs are based on an evolution of the SGX architecture codenamed Rogue. ST-Ericsson (now defunct) announced that its Nova application processors would include Imagination's next-generation PowerVR Series6 architecture. MediaTek announced the quad-core MT8135 system on a chip (SoC) (two ARM Cortex-A15 and two ARM Cortex-A7 cores) for tablets. Renesas announced its R-Car H2 SoC includes the G6400. Allwinner Technology A80 SoC, (4 Cortex-A15 and 4 Cortex-A7) that is available in the Onda V989 tablet, features a PowerVR G6230 GPU. The Apple A7 SoC integrates a graphics processing unit (GPU) which AnandTech believes to be a PowerVR G6430 in a four cluster configuration.

PowerVR Series 6 GPUs have 2 TMUs/cluster.

Series6XE (Rogue) 
PowerVR Series6XE GPUs are based around Series6 and designed as entry-level chips aimed at offering roughly the same fillrate compared to the Series5XT series. They however feature refreshed API support such as Vulkan, OpenGL ES 3.1, OpenCL 1.2 and DirectX 9.3 (9.3 L3). Rockchip and Realtek have used Series6XE GPUs in their SoCs.

PowerVR Series 6XE GPUs were announced on January 6, 2014.

Series6XT (Rogue)
PowerVR Series6XT GPUs aims at reducing power consumption further through die area and performance optimization providing a boost of up to 50% compared to Series6 GPUs. Those chips sport PVR3C triple compression system-level optimizations and Ultra HD deep color. The Apple iPhone 6, iPhone 6 Plus and iPod Touch (6th generation) with the A8 SoC feature the quad-core GX6450. An unannounced 8 cluster variant was used in the Apple A8X SoC for their iPad Air 2 model (released in 2014). The MediaTek MT8173 and Renesas R-Car H3 SoCs use Series6XT GPUs.

PowerVR Series 6XT GPUs were unveiled on January 6, 2014.

Series7XE (Rogue) 
PowerVR Series 7XE GPUs were announced on 10 November 2014. When announced, the 7XE series contained the smallest Android Extension Pack compliant GPU.

Series7XT (Rogue) 
PowerVR Series7XT GPUs are available in configurations ranging from two to 16 clusters, offering dramatically scalable performance from 100 GFLOPS to 1.5 TFLOPS. The GT7600 is used in the Apple iPhone 6s and iPhone 6s Plus models (released in 2015) as well as the Apple iPhone SE model (released in 2016) and the Apple iPad model (released in 2017) respectively. An unannounced 12 cluster variant was used in the Apple A9X SoC for their iPad Pro models (released in 2015).

PowerVR Series 7XT GPUs were unveiled on 10 November 2014.

Series7XT Plus (Rogue) 
PowerVR Series7XT Plus GPUs are an evolution of the Series7XT family and add specific features designed to accelerate computer vision on mobile and embedded devices, including new INT16 and INT8 data paths that boost performance by up to 4x for OpenVX kernels. Further improvements in shared virtual memory also enable OpenCL 2.0 support. The GT7600 Plus is used in the Apple iPhone 7 and iPhone 7 Plus models (released in 2016) as well as the Apple iPad model (released in 2018).

PowerVR Series 7XT Plus GPUs were announced on International CES, Las Vegas – 6 January 2016.

Series7XT Plus achieve up to 4x performance increase for vision applications.

The GPUs are designed to offer improved in-system efficiency, improved power efficiency and reduced bandwidth for vision and computational photography in consumer devices, mid-range and mainstream smartphones, tablets and automotive systems such as advanced driver assistance systems (ADAS), infotainment, computer vision and advanced processing for instrument clusters.

The new GPUs include new feature set enhancements with a focus on next-generation compute:

Up to 4x higher performance for OpenVX/vision algorithms compared to the previous generation through improved integer (INT) performance (2x INT16; 4x INT8)
Bandwidth and latency improvements through shared virtual memory (SVM) in OpenCL 2.0
Dynamic parallelism for more efficient execution and control through support for device enqueue in OpenCL 2.0

Series8XE (Rogue) 
PowerVR Series8XE GPUs support OpenGL ES 3.2 and Vulkan 1.x and are available in 1, 2, 4 and 8 pixel/clock configurations, enabling the latest games and apps and further driving down the cost of high quality UIs on cost sensitive devices.

PowerVR Series 8XE were announced February 22, 2016 at the Mobile World Congress 2016. They are an iteration of the Rogue microarchitecture and target entry-level SoC GPU market.
New GPUs improve the performance/mm2 for the smallest silicon footprint and power profile, while also incorporating hardware virtualization and multi-domain security. Newer model were later released in January 2017, with a new low end and high end part.

Series8XEP (Rogue) 
PowerVR Series8XEP were announced January 2017. There are an iteration of the Rogue microarchitecture and target the mid range SoC GPU market, targeting 1080p. The Series8XEP remains focused on die size and performance per unit

Series8XT (Furian) 
Announced on 8 March 2017, Furian is the first new PowerVR architecture since Rogue was introduced five years earlier.

PowerVR Series 8XT were announced March 8, 2017. It's the first series GPU's based on the new Furian architecture. According to Imagination, GFLOPS/mm2 is improved 35% and Fill rate/mm2 is improved 80% compared to the 7XT Plus series on the same node. Specific designs aren't announced as of March 2017. Series8XT features 32-wide pipeline clusters.

Series9XE (Rogue) 
Announced in September 2017, Series9XE family of GPUs benefit from up to 25% Bandwidth savings over the previous generation GPUs. The Series9XE family is targeted for set-top boxes (STB), digital TVs (DTV) and low end smartphones SoCs
Note: Data in table is per cluster.

Series9XM (Rogue) 
The Series9XM family of GPUs achieve up to 50% better performance density than the previous 8XEP generation. The Series9XM family targets mid-range smartphone SoCs.

Series9XEP (Rogue) 
The Series9XEP family of GPUs was announced on December 4, 2018. The Series9XEP family supports PVRIC4 image compression. The Series9XEP family targets set-top boxes (STB), digital TVs (DTV) and low end smartphones SoCs.

Series9XMP (Rogue) 
The Series9XMP family of GPUs was announced on December 4, 2018. The Series9XMP family supports PVRIC4 image compression. The Series9XMP family targets mid-range smartphone SoCs.

Series9XTP (Furian) 
The Series9XTP family of GPUs was announced on December 4, 2018. The Series9XTP family supports PVRIC4 image compression. The Series9XTP family targets high-end smartphone SoCs. Series9XTP features 40-wide pipeline clusters.

IMG A-Series (Albiorix) 
The A-Series GPUs offer up to 250% better performance density than the previous Series 9. These GPUs are no longer called PowerVR, they are called IMG.

IMG B-Series 
The B-Series GPUs offer up to 25% lower die space and 30% lower power than the previous A-Series.

IMG C-Series (Photon) 
Imagination Technologies announced on the 4th of November 2021 the new c-series gpu architecture.

Notes

 All models support Tile based deferred rendering (TBDR)

PowerVR Vision & AI

Series2NX 
The Series2NX family of Neural Network Accelerators (NNA) was announced on September 21, 2017.

Series2NX core options:

Series3NX 
The Series3NX family of Neural Network Accelerators (NNA) was announced on December 4, 2018.

Series3NX core options:

Series3NX multi-core options

Series3NX-F 
The Series3NX-F family of Neural Network Accelerators (NNA) was announced alongside the Series3NX family. The Series3NX-F family combines the Series 3NX with a Rogue-based GPGPU (NNPU), and local RAM. This allows support for programmability and floating-point.

Implementations 
The PowerVR GPU variants can be found in the following table of systems on chips (SoC). Implementations of PowerVR accelerators in products are listed here.

See also
 List of products featuring PowerVR accelerators
 Adreno – GPU developed by Qualcomm
 Mali – available as SIP block to 3rd parties
 Vivante – available as SIP block to 3rd parties
 Tegra – family of SoCs for mobile computers, the graphics core could be available as SIP block to 3rd parties
 VideoCore – family of SOCs, by Broadcom, for mobile computers, the graphics core could be available as SIP block to 3rd parties
 Atom family of SoCs – with Intel graphics core, not licensed to 3rd parties
 AMD mobile APUs – with AMD graphics core, not licensed to 3rd parties

References

External links

PowerVR Technology Overview

Graphics hardware companies
Graphics processing units
Graphics cards